The playoff round of the 2022 IIHF World Championship was held from 26 to 29 May 2022. The top four of each preliminary group qualified for the playoff round.

Qualified teams

Qualified teams' seedings
Quarter-finalists were paired according to their positions in the groups: the first-place team in each preliminary-round group played the fourth-place team of the other group, while the second-place team played the third-place team of the other group.

Semi-finalists are paired according to their seeding after the preliminary round, which is determined by the following criteria: 1)position in the group; 2)number of points; 3)goal difference; 4)number of goals scored for; 5)seeding number entering the tournament. The best-ranked semi-finalist plays against the lowest-ranked semi-finalist, while the second-best ranked semi-finalist plays the third-best ranked semi-finalist.

Bracket
There was a re-seeding after the quarterfinals.

All times are local (UTC+3).

Quarterfinals

Germany vs Czech Republic

Sweden vs Canada

Switzerland vs United States

Finland vs Slovakia

Semifinals

Finland vs United States

Canada vs Czech Republic

Bronze medal game

Gold medal game

References

External links
Official website

P